Dev Joshi (born 28 November 2000) is an Indian film and television actor known for portraying the role of Baal Veer in Sony Sab's Baal Veer, Baalveer Returns and Baalveer 3. He has worked in more than 20 Gujarati movies and many advertisements. He is also known for playing the role of teenage Chandra Shekhar Azad in Chandrashekhar.

Personal life
Dev Joshi was brought up in Ahmedabad, Gujarat with his parents Dushyant Joshi and Devangna Joshi. He attends L.D. Arts College, Ahmedabad as a student of Political Science.

Career
Joshi, sometimes known as Baal Veer, started acting at a young age in stage performances, theatre, advertisements and regional Gujarati shows.

He made his debut on Hindi television as Young Shukra in 2009-2010 which aired on NDTV Imagine. He also played the lead role of Young Shaurya in Kashi - Ab Na Rahe Tera Kagaz Kora in 2010.

In 2012, he was cast in the lead role for Baal Veer in Baal Veer which aired on Sony SAB. After playing this role until 2016, he moved on to play teenage Chandra Shekhar Azad in Star Bharat's show Chandrashekhar. In 2019, he returned to Sony SAB to play Baal Veer in its sequel, Baalveer Returns.

Spaceflight 
Joshi applied to be a part of DearMoon project crew, the first private lunar orbital mission. In 2022, he was selected to participate with seven others who will fly to the Moon in a SpaceX lunar flight. He is the youngest crew member and is going to be the first Indian to fly around the Moon. The mission is scheduled to occur in 2023 aboard the SpaceX Starship.

Filmography

Television

Music videos

Awards

References

External links

 
 

2000 births
Living people
21st-century Indian male child actors
Indian male television actors
Actors from Mumbai
Male actors from Ahmedabad